Dares Phrygius, according to Homer, was a Trojan priest of Hephaestus. He was supposed to have been the author of an account of the destruction of Troy, and to have lived before Homer. A work in Latin, purporting to be a translation of this, and entitled Daretis Phrygii de excidio Troiae historia, was much read in the Middle Ages, and was then ascribed to Cornelius Nepos, who is made to dedicate it to Sallust; but the language better fits a period much later than the time of Nepos (probably the 5th century AD). 

It is doubtful whether the existing work is an abridgment of a larger Latin work or an adaptation of a Greek original. Together with the similar work of Dictys Cretensis (with which it is generally printed), the De excidio forms the chief source for the numerous medieval accounts of the Trojan legend, the so-called Matter of Troy. Dares has claimed 866,000 Greeks and 676,000 Trojans were killed in this war, but archaeology has uncovered nothing that suggests a war this large was ever fought on that site.

The work was a significant source for Joseph of Exeter's De bello Troiano. It was also completely reworked in the 8th century in Merovingian Gaul into the work entitled Historia de origine Francorum ('History of the Origins of the Franks'). It purports to describe the descent of the Franks from the Trojans and is attributed to Dares.

References

Sources

O.S. von Fleschenberg, Daresstudie, i, 1908.

(fr) Louis Faivre d'Arcier, Histoire et géographie d’un mythe. La circulation des manuscrits du De excidio Troiae de Darès le Phrygien (VIIIe-XVe s.), Paris, 2006.
(de) Andreas Beschorner, Untersuchungen zu Dares Phrygius-Narr, Tübingen, 1992.

External links
Daretis phrygii de excidio Troiae historia, Ferdinand Meister (ed.), Lipsiae, in aedibus B. G. Teubneri, 1873.
Full text at the Latin Library
The History of the Trojan War by Dares Phrygius translated by Jason Colavito (2011)
Jonathan Cornil, Dares Phrygius' de excidio Trojae historia: philological commentary and translation. Scriptie voorgedragen tot het bekomen van de graad van Master in de Taal- en letterkunde (Latijn-Engels), 2011–2012, Universiteit Gent.
R. M. Frazer, The Trojan War. The Chronicles of Dictys of Crete and Dares the Phrygian, Indiana University Press, 1966.

Trojan War literature
Characters in the Aeneid
Trojans
Phrygian characters in Greek mythology